Tiantai (天台宗) is a sect of Buddhism, also called Tendai in Japanese.

It may also refer to the following locations in China:

Tiantai Mountain
Tiantai County, Zhejiang
Tiantai, Guizhou, town in Chishui City
Tiantai, Jiangxi, town in Yuanzhou District, Yichun
Tiantai, Jilin, town in Dehui
Tiantai Township, Xuanhan County, Sichuan